Santel is a surname. Notable people with the surname include:

Ad Santel (1887–1966), German-born American wrestler
Mark Santel (born 1968), American soccer player and coach

See also
Sante
Santel, Texas
Santelli